Ousas, also Ousanas III (c. 500), was a king of the Kingdom of Aksum. He succeeded Nezool atop the throne.

Ousas is primarily known from the coins that were minted during his reign. Since the gold coins issued with this king's name closely resemble those of King Kaleb of Axum, Munro-Hay suggests that Ousas may be another name of Tazena, who is described both in Ethiopian tradition and on Kaleb's coins as his father.

Notes 

Kings of Axum
5th-century monarchs in Africa
6th-century monarchs in Africa